Yenoam (or Yanoam) is a place in ancient Canaan, or in Syria, known from Ancient Egyptian regnal sources, of the time of Thutmose III to Ramesses III. One such source is a stela of Seti I found in Beit She'an. Another is the Merneptah Stele.

The location of Yenoam is a matter of speculation. Suggested sites include: 
Tell Shihab in Yarmouk River valley in southern Syria, 
Tell Na'ama (Na'ameh) in Hula Valley, 
Tell Na'am (en-Naam) near Yavne'el, and 
Tell Ovadya (Ubeidiya) in the Jordan Valley. 

It has been tentatively associated with the biblical city of Janoah (ynwḥ).

References

Mohamed Raafat Abbas, “The Town of Yenoam in the Ramesside War Scenes and Texts of Karnak”, Cahiers de Karnak 16 (2017), 329–341.

External links
Sety I War Scenes from Karnak Temple
Campaign of Seti I in Northern Palestine

Archaeology of Israel
Archaeology of Syria
Ancient cities of the Middle East
Lost ancient cities and towns